Ellen DeGeneres: Here and Now is a stand-up comedy routine that was shown on HBO. This was Ellen DeGeneres's second HBO special. This hour-long special focused on everyday situations, as DeGeneres put it: modern life and other inconveniences. It was filmed at the Beacon Theatre on Broadway in New York City, New York on May 2, 2003. The show first aired on June 25, 2003.

Subjects addressed
 Procrastination
 Television
 Cellular Phone Conversations
 Self-esteem
 Laziness
 Yogurt 
 Movie Theaters
 Embarrassing Situations 
 Etiquette

References

External links 

 DeGeneres - Stand Up Comedy

2003 television specials
2000s American television specials
Here and Now
HBO network specials
Stand-up comedy concert films
2003 comedy films
Films directed by Joel Gallen